The 1975 NC State Wolfpack football team represented North Carolina State University during the 1975 NCAA Division I football season. The Wolfpack were led by head coach Lou Holtz, in his fourth and final year with the team, and played their home games at Carter Stadium in Raleigh, North Carolina. They competed as members of the Atlantic Coast Conference, finishing in third. NC State was invited to the 1975 Peach Bowl in Atlanta, where they lost to West Virginia. Holtz left at the conclusion of the season to accept the head coaching position with the New York Jets.

Schedule

Roster

References

NC State
NC State Wolfpack football seasons
NC State Wolfpack football